Penpahad is a village in Suryapet district of the Indian state of Telangana. It is the headquarters of Penpahad mandal of Suryapet division. It is located 18 km from district headquarters, Suryapet.

Geography
It is in the  elevation (altitude).

Demographics
Penpahad has population of 2887 of which 1509 are males while 1,378 are females as per Population Census 2011. The literacy rate of village was 66.03% where male literacy stands at 77.61% and female literacy rate at 54.41%.

Politics
It falls under Suryapet Assembly constituency and the village is administrated by a sarpanch, who is the elected representative of the village.

References

Mandal headquarters in Suryapet district
Villages in Suryapet district